General Union of Arab Students is a federation of student organizations in the Arab world. The headquarters of the organization are based in Damascus, Syria. The general secretary of GUAS is Nidal Ammar.

External links
GUAS website

References

Ethnic student organizations
Organizations based in Damascus
Youth organizations based in Syria